Sterkfontein Dam Nature Reserve, Free State, South Africa is an 18,000 Ha reserve situated to the south west of Harrismith. The reserve is close to the Drakensberg Mountain nature reserve. The reserve offers campsites and hiking trails and a large variety of fauna and flora.

Fauna and flora

Antelope
Oribi
Mountain reedbuck
Grey rhebuck

Birdlife

Trees
Yellowwood
Wild peach
Koko tree
Silky bark

Grasses and bushes
Wild myrtle
Redwood rooihout (not to be confused with the redwood tree)
Ouhout
Bush guarri
Highveld protea
Silver sugarbush
Tree fern

Gallery
(Click to enlarge)

Notes
This park will be included into the Maloti-Drakensberg Transfrontier Conservation Area, Peace Park.

Further reading

PlantZAfrica.com The site for information about plants native to southern Africa and related topics.

References

Nature reserves in South Africa
Protected areas of the Free State (province)
Maluti-a-Phofung